El Burgo is a village and municipality in the province of Málaga, located in the autonomous community of Andalusia in southern Spain. It is located in the Parque Natural Sierra de las Nieves which was declared a Biosphere Reserve by UNESCO.

In February they have a carnaval. Saint Augustine is celebrated at the end of August with traditional costumes, music, food and religious singing.

References

Municipalities in the Province of Málaga